is an educational institution affiliated with the Japan Meteorological Agency; its purpose is to train officials of the agency. It is located in Kashiwa, Chiba. The predecessor of the school was founded in 1922, and it was chartered as a four-year college in 1962.

External links
 Official website 

Japan Meteorological Agency
Daigakkō in Japan
Universities and colleges in Chiba Prefecture
Educational institutions established in 1922
Meteorology and climate education
1922 establishments in Japan